This is a demography of the population of Anguilla including population density, ethnicity, education level, health of the populace, economic status, religious affiliations and other aspects of the population.

Population

72% of the population is Anguillian while 28% is non-Anguillian (2001 census). Of the non-Anguillian population, many are citizens of the United States, United Kingdom, St Kitts & Nevis, the Dominican Republic, Jamaica and Nigeria.

2006 and 2007 saw an influx of large numbers of Chinese, Indian, and Mexican workers, brought in as labor for major tourist developments due to the local population not being large enough to support the labor requirements.

Vital statistics

Ethnic groups

Languages
English (official).

The 2001 census found 11,329 were capable of carrying a conversation in English, and 101 were not.  82 of those spoke Spanish as a first language, 7 spoke Chinese.

The 2001 census found one heptalingual person, 13 pentalingual people, 35 quadrilingual people, 173 trilingual people, 881 bilingual people

The total numbers of speakers of each language were:

Religion

Anguilla is predominantly Christian, with more than 85% identifying themselves with a denomination of Christianity. Migration has also resulted in various other religions to make a presence in Anguilla.

See also 
Hinduism in the West Indies

References 

 
Society of Anguilla